Thomas C. Gale (born 18 June 1943) is an American automobile designer widely known for his work with the Chrysler, Dodge and Plymouth marques. Gale and his design partners Trevor Creed and John Herlitz were instrumental with breakthrough designs that rescued Chrysler twice from the brink of bankruptcy.

Early life
Gale was born in 1943 to Tom Gale Sr., who was an engineer in GM's Buick division. Growing up in Flint, Michigan, Gale showed a keen interest in automobiles. In 1966, he graduated from Michigan State with a degree in engineering.

Time at Chrysler

Gale joined Chrysler as an engineer, working in the newly formed advanced body-engineering group. Later, he moved into the design department for Lee Iacocca's K-Car project. Gale was later promoted to head the Chrysler styling department, being involved in the designs of: the 1991 Dodge Stealth, the 1992 Dodge Viper, which evolved from the earlier concept without many changes, the swoopy Chrysler LH series models which were introduced in 1993, the 1994 Dodge Ram pickup series, the 1996 NS Minivans, and the 2001 Plymouth Prowler. Designed into production form in 2000, the 2005 model year Chrysler 300C and 2005 Dodge Magnum exteriors were the final vehicles Gale designed for Chrysler before his retirement in December of that year.  He presented concept cars such as the 1993 Chrysler Thunderbolt, 1995 Atlantic, 1997 Phaeton. While at Chrysler, his most notable design was the Lamborghini Diablo.

Retirement and consultancy
Gale retired from Chrysler in December of 2000, after their merger with Daimler Benz, running a design consultancy that created a line of instruments for Classic Instruments Inc. He built Hot Rods, including a 1933 Ford highboy roadster with a Hemi V8.

References

External links
Tom Gale Hall of Fame Inductee - The Face of Design 
Tom Gale: The man who helped Motown find its mojo
[Findarticles.com/p/articles/mi_m3012/is_2_180/ai_59966973/ Executive of the year - Chrysler designer Tom Gale by Marjorie Sorge, Feb. 2000]

1943 births
American automobile designers
Chrysler designers
People in the automobile industry
Living people
Michigan State University alumni